Desi is a village in the historical region of Khevi, north-eastern Georgia. It is located on the left bank of the Tergi tributary river – Desi. Administratively, it is part of the Kazbegi Municipality in Mtskheta-Mtianeti. Distance to the municipality center Stepantsminda is 38 km.

Sources 
 Georgian Soviet Encyclopedia, V. 3, p. 404, Tbilisi, 1978 year.

References

Kobi Community villages